Mohan Chand Sharma AC (23 September 1965 – 19 September 2008) was an Indian police officer who was killed during the 2008 Batla House encounter in New Delhi. He was posthumously awarded the Gallantry medal Ashoka Chakra Award, India's highest peacetime military decoration, on 26 January 2009.

Life and career
Sharma, a Kumaoni, was born in Chaukhutia Masi region of Almora in Uttarakhand. He joined the Delhi Police as a sub-inspector in 1989, and continued to serve for 19 years. He was a part of the Special Cell, an anti-terrorist unit of the Delhi Police Force.

Sharma was involved in an encounter with the terrorist Abu Hamza at Jawaharlal Nehru Stadium in 2006, and in the arrest of four Jaish-e-Mohammad militants in February 2007 after an encounter at DDU Marg, Delhi.

He received a number of awards and decorations during his career, including seven gallantry awards.

Death
Sharma died on 19 September 2008, aged 42, after sustaining injuries during the Batla House encounter with Indian Mujahideen's terrorists involved in the 13 September 2008 Delhi bombings. Sharma received bullet injuries to his abdomen, thighs and right arm. According to the autopsy performed at the AIIMS, he died of excessive bleeding.

Batla House case
He was a part of the 2008 Batla House encounter case with Delhi Police.
He played a major role in this case, and a film was also made about it called Batla House. In the movie, his character was called as K. K. and played by actor Ravi Kishan.

Tributes
A number of high officials paid tribute to Sharma, including Home Minister Shivraj Patil and Police Commissioner Y. S. Dadhwal. Prime Minister Manmohan Singh praised his "exceptional courage" and called him "an inspiration for our security forces." The Prime Minister also sent a message of condolence to Sharma's wife, as did INC president Sonia Gandhi.

References

 
2008 deaths
People from Delhi
1965 births
Recipients of the Ashoka Chakra (military decoration)
Indian police officers killed in the line of duty
Ashoka Chakra